A Show of Hands is a live album by the Canadian rock band Rush, released in 1989. The band released a video of the same name, originally on VHS and LaserDisc, the same year. A DVD version was released as part of a box set in 2006, and as an individual DVD in 2007. In 2015 it was reissued after being remastered by Sean Magee at Abbey Road Studios following a direct approach by Rush to remaster their entire back catalogue.

Recording
The majority of the performances on this album were from the 1988 Hold Your Fire tour, recorded in the American cities of New Orleans, Phoenix, and San Diego, and the British city of Birmingham. "Mystic Rhythms" and "Witch Hunt" were recorded in East Rutherford, New Jersey, during the 1986 Power Windows tour. The opening track "Intro" features The Three Stooges theme playing in the background; the band used this music to open many of their concerts during the 1980s.

With the exception of "Closer to the Heart", the tracklist focuses almost entirely on the band's material from the 1980s, and is Rush's only live record to feature no performances of songs released before 1977. Unlike All the World's a Stage and Exit...Stage Left, this album does not have any songs that had to be omitted for single CD release.  The first two were released prior to the introduction of compact discs and were double album sets, whilst this album was initially released on CD so time restrictions were already taken into account.

Video release
The video was filmed at the first of two Birmingham (UK) shows which took place on April 23–24, 1988 at the city's NEC Arena - one of the sources of the live album. The song order and selection of the video are different from the live album.

Singles
"Closer to the Heart" / "Witch Hunt" (7")
"Mission" (12" promo)
"Marathon" (12"/CD promo)

Track listing
All songs written by Alex Lifeson, Geddy Lee and Neil Peart, except where noted.

Track 4 features a drum solo.

Personnel
Geddy Lee – bass guitar, synthesizers, vocals
Alex Lifeson – electric and acoustic guitars, synthesizers, backing vocals 
Neil Peart – drums, percussion

Charts

Certifications

Remaster details
A Show of Hands was remastered in 2011 by Andy VanDette for the "Sector" box sets, which re-released all of Rush's Mercury-era albums.  A Show Of Hands is included in the Sector 3 set.

References

External links
 

1989 live albums
Anthem Records live albums
Rush (band) live albums
Mercury Records live albums
Vertigo Records live albums